The 2012–13 Toledo Rockets men's basketball team represented the University of Toledo during the 2012–13 NCAA Division I men's basketball season. The Rockets, led by third year head coach Tod Kowalczyk, played their home games at the Savage Arena and were members of the West Division of the Mid-American Conference. Due to low APR scores, the Rockets were ineligible for post season play, including the MAC Tournament. They finished the season 15–13, 10–6 in MAC play to finish in a tie for the West Division championship. However, due to their postseason ban, the MAC did not allow them to be division champions.

Roster

Schedule

|-
!colspan=9| Exhibition

|-
!colspan=9| Regular Season

References

Toledo Rockets men's basketball seasons
Toledo